The following is a list of county routes in Humboldt County, Iowa.  All county roads are maintained by the county in which they reside, and all are marked with standard MUTCD approved county road shields. Humboldt County's routes all follow Iowa's alphanumeric system.

List of current County Routes in Humboldt County, Iowa
This list is up to date as of December 2017.

References

Transportation in Humboldt County, Iowa
Humboldt
Humboldt County